Theodore Edward Fritsch Jr.  (born August 26, 1950) is a former American football center in the National Football League.  His father, Ted Fritsch, played for the Green Bay Packers in the 1940s. Fritsch played college football at St. Norbert College. He now lives in Marietta, Georgia with his wife, Roberta. He has three children.

1950 births
Living people
American football offensive linemen
Atlanta Falcons players
Washington Redskins players
St. Norbert Green Knights football players
Sportspeople from Green Bay, Wisconsin
Players of American football from Marietta, Georgia
Players of American football from Wisconsin